Stuffed quinces are made of quinces stuffed with meat (lamb) and rice. The ingredients are ground meat, rice, quince, grape molasses, coriander, salt, and warm water.

See also
 List of stuffed dishes

References

Balkan cuisine
Stuffed vegetable dishes
Turkish cuisine dolmas and sarmas
Azerbaijani cuisine